The 1873 Virginia gubernatorial election was held on May 27, 1873 to elect the governor of Virginia.

Results

References

1873
Virginia
gubernatorial
March 1873 events